The ABQ Biopark Botanic Garden is a  botanical garden located at 2601 Central Avenue NW in Albuquerque, New Mexico, beside the Rio Grande. The garden showcases plants of the Southwest and other arid climates, and includes a  conservatory. One wing of the glass conservatory houses plants native to the Mediterranean climates zones of Spain, Portugal, Turkey, South Africa, Australia, Chile and California. A second wing features xeric plants from North American deserts. The garden also features various exhibitions showcasing plants of different local habitats in New Mexico, medicinal plants, a butterfly pavilion and other attractions.  The Garden's design was awarded as the 2019 Architecture + Community Award by the New Mexico Architectural Foundation.

See also 
 List of botanical gardens in the United States

References

Botanical gardens in New Mexico
Tourist attractions in Albuquerque, New Mexico
Parks in Bernalillo County, New Mexico
Japanese gardens in the United States